Ernst Josef Fittkau (22 July 1927 – 12 May 2012) was a German entomologist and herpetologist.

Career
In entomology he specialized in the Diptera, especially the family Chironomidae. In herpetology he specialized in crocodiles. He collected natural history specimens on every continent except Antarctica, beginning with South America in 1960. He was Director of the Bavarian State Collection of Zoology in Munich (Zoologische Staatssammlung München) from 1976 to 1992.

Legacy
Fittkau is commemorated in the scientific name of a species of South American lizard, Liolaemus fittkaui.

Publications
Fittkau EJ (1995). Johann Baptist Ritter von Spix. Rundgespräche der Kommission für Ökologie. Tropenforschung. Bayer. Akad. d. Wissenschaften 10: 29–38. (in German).

Source
Hausmann A, Spies M, Diller J (2012). "In memoriam Prof. Dr. Ernst Josef Fittkau (22. Juli 1927 - 12. Mai 2012)". Spixiana 35 (2): 161-176.   (pdf). (in German).

References

1927 births
2012 deaths
German entomologists
Dipterists